Suzanne Nilsson (born 25 October 1966) is a former Swedish Olympic swimmer. She competed in the 1988 Summer Olympics, where she swum the 200 m freestyle and the 4×100 m freestyle relay.

Clubs
Helsingborgs SS

References

1966 births
Living people
Swimmers at the 1988 Summer Olympics
Olympic swimmers of Sweden
European Aquatics Championships medalists in swimming
Helsingborgs SS swimmers
Swedish female freestyle swimmers
20th-century Swedish women